Brian Bason (born 3 September 1955) is an English retired footballer who played as a midfielder.

He attended Thomas Bennett School (now Thomas Bennett Community College) in Crawley in West Sussex and played for England Schoolboys as a left-back. He later played for a number of clubs in the Football League, including Chelsea and Plymouth Argyle.

A goal he scored for Chelsea against Carlisle was judged the sixth best goal of 1976.

After retirement Bason was known to have been living in Truro, Cornwall where he ran a hotel/public house.

References

External links
Brian Bason at pompeyrama.com

1955 births
English footballers
English expatriate footballers
Vancouver Whitecaps (1974–1984) players
Chelsea F.C. players
Plymouth Argyle F.C. players
Portsmouth F.C. players
Crystal Palace F.C. players
Living people
Association football midfielders
English Football League players
Reading F.C. players
Sportspeople from Epsom
England youth international footballers
North American Soccer League (1968–1984) players
Expatriate soccer players in Canada
English expatriate sportspeople in Canada